Mooning the Cog is a tradition in which hikers bare their buttocks to the Cog Railway on Mount Washington, the highest peak in New Hampshire. It is most commonly done by thru-hikers, as they pass by on the Appalachian Trail. It is a twenty- to thirty-year-old tradition, in which, as the train passes the trail, many hikers choose to drop their drawers and moon the passengers. There are several theories as to the reasons for this tradition. One holds that it is an act of protest against the smoke, steam, and noise pollution generated by the railroad, which is known as the "Smog Railway" to some hikers. According to others, it is a reference to the train's original name, "The Railway to the Moon".

Arrests
The practice, though longstanding, is considered offensive by some of the Cog Railway's passengers. An off-duty New Hampshire State Trooper and a Forest Ranger began riding the train and arresting hikers who mooned it. During the autumn of 2007, eight hikers were arrested and were to be charged in a federal court, due to the act having taken place in a National Forest.

Sources

Appalachian Trail
Mount Washington (New Hampshire)
Civil disobedience
Gestures
Nudity in the United States
Protest tactics
Buttocks